Svenska Cupen 1997–98 was the 43rd season of the main Swedish football Cup. The final of the competition took place on 14 May 1998 and was held in Gothenburg. Örgryte IS  and Helsingborgs IF drew 1–1 before an attendance of 2,559 spectators.  The replay was held in Helsingborg a week later with the score also 1–1 with Helsingborgs IF winning 3–0 on penalties. Public interest was much greater for this match with an attendance of 13,092.

Preliminary round 1

Preliminary round 2

First round

Second round

Third round

Fourth round

Fifth round
The 8 matches in this round were played between 28 March and 4 April 1998.

Quarter-finals
The 4 matches in this round were played between 8 April and 20 April 1998.

Semi-finals
The semi-finals were played on 7 May 1998.

Final
The final was played on 14 May 1998 in Gothenburg and the replay on 21 May 1998 in Helsingborg.

Footnotes

References 

Svenska Cupen seasons
Cupen
Cupen
Sweden